James Jordan (born March 14, 1979) is an American actor.

Life and career
Jordan was born on March 14, 1979, in Houston Texas. He grew up in Texas and Webb City, Missouri, graduating from Webb City High School in 1997. Jordan went to college at Missouri Southern in Joplin and graduated from UCLA School of Theater, Film and Television with a Master of Fine Arts in Acting.

Jordan has had roles in series such as Veronica Mars, playing two different characters (Lucky, a janitor at Neptune High, and Tim Foyle), and has also appeared in Without a Trace, Seraphim Falls, Just Legal, Cold Case, Close to Home and CSI: Crime Scene Investigation among other prime-time television dramas.

Jordan has guest-starred on TNT's The Closer, Fox's 24 opposite Kiefer Sutherland, and he had a guest star role on FX's Elmore Leonard-inspired series Justified starring Timothy Olyphant. Jordan was also cast as the mentally disturbed former Marine "Ray Brennan" in TNT's adaptation of April Smith's thriller novel Good Morning, Killer. The film aired as part of TNT's Movie Mystery Night in December 2011.

In 2012, Jordan played one of the "Obamas" on HBO's hit series, True Blood. He played "Ray", the anti-vampire bigot that takes Jessica Hamby hostage. He also played a role in Best Night Ever, a comedy from the creators of the Scary Movie franchise, which was released in 2014. He guest starred on CBS' The Mentalist in the winter of 2012.

Jordan guest-starred in season three of Hulu series Blue starring Julia Stiles. Season three premiered in late March 2014. He was cast in two independent feature films in March 2015: Message from the King starring Chadwick Boseman, Luke Evans, Alfred Molina, directed by Fabrice Du Welz, and in the Kelly Reichardt directed ensemble piece Certain Women about life in small town Montana with Kristen Stewart, Laura Dern, and Michelle Williams. Both films were slated for released in 2016.

In 2017, Jordan appeared in Wind River, written and directed by Taylor Sheridan. In 2021, Jordan was cast in Those Who Wish Me Dead. Jordan also had recurring roles in several Sheridan created television shows such as Yellowstone, Mayor of Kingstown, and 1883.

Filmography

Film

Television

Web

Video games

External links

1979 births
Living people
American male television actors
Male actors from Houston
Place of birth missing (living people)
UCLA Film School alumni